Antonio Nathanahel Santos (born October 6, 1996) is a Dominican professional baseball pitcher who is a free agent. He formerly played for the Colorado Rockies.

Career

Colorado Rockies
Santos signed with the Colorado Rockies as an international free agent on July 2, 2015. He spent the 2015 season with the DSL Rockies, going 1–2 with a 0.75 ERA over 24 innings. He split the 2016 season between the DSL and the Boise Hawks, going a combined 6–4 with a 3.87 ERA over  innings. He spent the 2017 season with the Asheville Tourists, going 9–10 with a 5.39 ERA over 147 innings. He split the 2018 season between Asheville and the Lancaster JetHawks, going a combined 5–13 with a 4.80 ERA over 152 innings. He split the 2019 season between Lancaster and the Hartford Yard Goats, going a combined 6–9 with a 4.53 ERA over 145 innings. Santos played in the Arizona Fall League for the Salt River Rafters following the 2019 season. 

The Rockies added him to their 40-man roster after the 2019 season. 

On September 1, 2020, Santos was promoted to the major leagues for the first time and he made his debut that day against the San Francisco Giants.

New York Mets
The New York Mets claimed Santos off waivers on November 24, 2021. On March 13, 2022, Santos was outrighted off of the 40-man roster and assigned to the Triple-A Syracuse Mets. He elected free agency following the season on November 10, 2022.

References

External links

1996 births
Living people
Major League Baseball players from the Dominican Republic
Major League Baseball pitchers
Colorado Rockies players
Dominican Summer League Rockies players
Boise Hawks players
Asheville Tourists players
Lancaster JetHawks players
Hartford Yard Goats players
Salt River Rafters players